Éric Jean-Jean (born 20 September 1967) is a French radio and television host. He is occasionally an actor.

Biography
In 1988, he became a radio host joining the team Wit FM Bordeaux. After three years during which he mainly led interviews of singers, he was quickly spotted by the station NRJ in 1991, but continued the interviews.

In 1998, he hosted shows including Studio 22, Toute la musique que j'aime and others on RTL.

Furthermore, he made several television appearances in collaboration with NRJ and RTL, including several prime-times on channels TF1 and M6.

In 2008, M6 envisaged to propose to Jean-Jean the hosting of Nouvelle Star.

Radio career
 on NRJ :
 6:00 am–9:00 am
 9:00 am–12:00 am
 on RTL :
 RTL vous offre vos vacances
 Concert d'un soir
 Les Mots bleus
 Paroles et Musique
 Studio 22
 Toute la musique que j'aime
 Ma liste préfèrée
 On en parlera demain
 Bonus Track
 Stop ou Encore
 on RTL2 :
 Le Drive RTL2

TV career
 Tip-Top (TF1 – 1995)
 Dance d'or (TF1 – 1996)
 Soir Hit Machine (M6 – 1996)
 50 ans de tubes (TF1 – 1999)
 OVNI (France 3 – 2000)
 Les Victoires de la Musique (France 2 – 2002)
 Voix sur Berges (France 3, France 4, Odyssée – 2005–2006)
 Demi-Finale de l'Eurovision 2006 (France4 – 2006)
 C'est Mieux le matin 2006 (France 3)
 Concert Champ libre (France 2 : 14 July 2008)

Filmography
 Héroïne by Gérard Kraftzick, 1995
 Un homme à la maison, TV film, 1999

References

External links
 Official site

1967 births
Living people
French music journalists
French radio presenters
French television presenters
People from Gironde